Interstate 65 (I-65) enters the US state of Kentucky from Tennessee,  south of Franklin. It passes by the major cities of Bowling Green, Elizabethtown, and Louisville before exiting the state into Indiana.

Route description
Along its  length in Kentucky, major attractions I-65 passes include the National Corvette Museum, Mammoth Cave National Park, Bernheim Arboretum and Research Forest, and Fort Knox before entering the state's largest metropolitan area, Louisville.

It has interchanges with three of the state's parkways. The first of these is with the Louie B. Nunn Cumberland Parkway north of Bowling Green between Smiths Grove and Park City. At Elizabethtown, it has two more parkway interchanges with the Wendell H. Ford Western Kentucky Parkway and the Martha Layne Collins Bluegrass Parkway.

I-65 also has interchanges with I-165 (formerly the William H. Natcher Parkway) near Bowling Green, I-265, I-264, and a complex junction with I-64 and I-71 along the south bank of the Ohio River in central Louisville. From there, northbound motorists on I-65 cross into Indiana on the Abraham Lincoln Bridge, while southbound I-65 traffic enters Kentucky from Jeffersonville, Indiana, via the John F. Kennedy Memorial Bridge.

The route is reportedly one of the heaviest traveled corridors in the US, with average daily traffic volumes of 50,000 to 70,000 vehicles. Most of the route has been widened to six lanes throughout the state. The widest stretch of I-65 in its entirety is in Louisville, at Kentucky Route 1065 (KY 1065, Outer Loop) where the mainline is 14 lanes wide, with seven lanes on each side.

The highway crosses the line between the Central Time Zone and Eastern Time Zone at the border of Hart and LaRue counties.

For most of 2016, the Ohio River Bridges Project routed all I-65 traffic onto the Abraham Lincoln Bridge (a six-lane cable-stayed bridge now carrying only northbound traffic) while rebuilding the deck of the 1963 John F. Kennedy Memorial Bridge to accommodate six lanes of all-southbound traffic. The project is also completing the rebuild of the Kennedy Interchange just south of both bridges in Downtown Louisville. On December 30, 2016, both I-65 bridges began using electronic toll collection (ETC) to charge motorists for their use of this previously toll-free Interstate crossing.

History
When Interstate 65 signs first went up in Kentucky, state policy dictated that KY 65, a north-south route west of I-65, be renumbered. It was designated KY 259, which matched the telephone exchange prefix of the largest town it serves, Leitchfield.

Kentucky Turnpike

From July 25, 1954, until June 30, 1975, the portion of I-65 from I-264 in Louisville to the Western Kentucky Parkway in Elizabethtown was a toll road bearing the Kentucky Turnpike name. It was signed with a distinctive sign featuring a cardinal, the state bird of Kentucky. Unlike most states, Kentucky law requires that tolls be removed when the original construction bonds are paid off and cannot be extended. The road was thus the first of the state's extensive system of toll roads to be made free. Unlike the other roads, which maintain their separate names when becoming toll-free, the Kentucky Turnpike signs were removed with the tollbooths.

Original toll plazas and charges
The table below shows the original locations of the toll plazas and toll charges for consumer-sized, or class-one, vehicles.

Service areas
In addition to toll plazas, the Kentucky Turnpike also provided two service areas just south of Lebanon Junction and just north of Shepherdsville. They each provided a gas station and at least one fast food restaurant. They both closed May 31, 1984. The former service areas were located in the median between the northbound and southbound lanes, and, when the former Turnpike was reconstructed into Interstate Highway standards in the early 1980s, this necessitated the removal of left exit and entrance ramps from the primary travel lanes. Initially, the rebuilt highway was routed around the service areas: to the east of the Shepherdsville service area allowing only southbound access and to the west of the Lebanon Junction service area allowing only northbound access; however, this arrangement was incompatible with the existing contracts with concession operators at the service areas. These contracts specified that both service areas would be accessible to both northbound and southbound traffic. Faced with either the construction of expensive crossover ramps at both locations or buying out the concession contracts, the Kentucky Transportation Cabinet (KYTC) elected to buy out the concession contracts and close both service areas.

21st century
On November 15, 2006, the stretch of I-65 from Bowling Green to Louisville was renamed the Abraham Lincoln Memorial Highway.

On February 12, 2007, a bill passed the Kentucky Senate to rename I-65 in Jefferson County the "Dr. Martin Luther King Jr. Expressway". Signage was posted July 25, 2007.

In 2008, Governor Steve Beshear ordered the entire route to be widened to a minimum of six lanes through the entire state. This project won an award under the "Under Budget—Medium" category in the Southeast Regional competition of the 2014 America's Transportation Awards. The project was completed spring of 2019 with the final  stretch between Sonora and Elizabethtown. 

In July 2017, the KYTC opened a new interchange of I-65 at milemarker 30 to provide access to the Kentucky Transpark near Bowling Green. The $66.8-million project, which began in 2016, would improve traffic conditions along I-65 and U.S. Route 31W (US 31W) in northeastern Warren County. The first phase of the project include the new interchange, exit 30, plus a four-lane connector road going from the Interstate to US 68 just east of Bowling Green. The second phase is building a two-lane connector road running from US 68 to US 31W between Bowling Green and Oakland, thus relieving congestion problems on both U.S. Routes. This was the first new exit on I-65 since 2002, when the interchange with KY 234 was built to connect downtown Bowling Green from the freeway.

Exit list

Auxiliary routes
: A spur running from I-65 in Bowling Green to Owensboro. Formerly the William H. Natcher Parkway.
: Forms three-quarters of a beltway around the Louisville metropolitan area. The signage runs from I-65 to I-71 on the northeast side of the metro area. It is cosigned with KY 841 for its entire length and is known as the Gene Snyder Freeway. Construction of the Lewis and Clark Bridge over the Ohio River to connect the Kentucky segment of I-265 with the Indiana segment was completed and opened to traffic on December 18, 2016.

See also

Ohio River Bridges Project
Roads in Louisville, Kentucky

References

External links

 Kentucky
65
0065
Transportation in Barren County, Kentucky
Transportation in Bullitt County, Kentucky
Transportation in Edmonson County, Kentucky
Transportation in Hardin County, Kentucky
Transportation in Hart County, Kentucky
Transportation in Jefferson County, Kentucky
Transportation in LaRue County, Kentucky
Transportation in Simpson County, Kentucky
Transportation in Warren County, Kentucky